Billbergiopsis is a subgenus of the genus Quesnelia and contains 14 of the 20 or more described species of the genus.

Species
, the Encyclopaedia of Bromeliads placed 14 species in the subgenus:
 Quesnelia alvimii Leme
 Quesnelia augustocoburgii Wawra
 Quesnelia blanda Wawra (listed as Quesnelia strobilispica)
 Quesnelia dubia Leme
 Quesnelia edmundoi L.B.Sm.
 Quesnelia humilis Mez
 Quesnelia imbricata L.B.Sm.
 Quesnelia indecora Mez
 Quesnelia kautskyi C.Vieira
 Quesnelia lateralis Wawra
 Quesnelia liboniana (De Jonghe) Mez
 Quesnelia marmorata (Lem.) Read
 Quesnelia seideliana L.B.Sm. & Reitz
 Quesnelia vasconcelosiana Leme

References

Quesnelia
Plant subgenera